Santilya is an administrative ward in the Mbeya Rural district of the Mbeya Region of Tanzania. In 2016 the Tanzania National Bureau of Statistics report there were 19,373 people in the ward, from 17,578 in 2012.

Villages and hamlets 
The ward has 11 villages, and 62 hamlets.

 Santilya
 Ibungu
 Ivugula
 Iyungwe
 Izosya
 Mantanji
 Mtyeti
 Soweto
 Sanje
 Ilindi
 Magao
 Mantenga
 Sanje A
 Sanje B
 Santwinji
 Swaya
 Iswago
 Hazumbi
 Inyala A
 Inyala B
 Itambila
 Lusungo
 Nsongole
 Ntenga
 Ntete
 Shikulusi
 Sindyanga
 Mpande
 Idunda A
 Idunda B
 Mpande A
 Mpande B
 Jojo
 Horongo
 Ilewe A
 Ilewe B
 Ilomba
 Itundu A
 Itundu B
 Ivugula
 Iwale
 Jojo
 Mwanjelwa
 Nsheha
 Ilembo
 Nsheha
 Sukamawela
 Itizi
 Itizi "A"
 Itizi "B"
 Itizi "C"
 Ruanda
 Isuwa
 Ivimbizya A
 Ivimbizya B
 Ntole
 Shipongo A
 Shipongo B
 Mpande
 Idunda A
 Idunda B
 Mpande A
 Mpande B
 Isongole
 Isongole A
 Isongole B
 Shizyangule
 Ugaya A
 Ugaya B
 Masyeta
 Masyeta "A"
 Masyeta "B"
 Masyeta "C"

References 

Wards of Mbeya Region